Ratasa is a monotypic snout moth genus described by Gottlieb August Wilhelm Herrich-Schäffer in 1849. It contains only one species, Ratasa alienalis, described by Eduard Friedrich Eversmann in 1844, which is found in Russia.

References

Phycitini
Monotypic moth genera
Moths described in 1844
Moths of Europe
Pyralidae genera